Lafferty Motorsports was an American auto racing team based in Concord, North Carolina. It was owned by driver and crew chief Chris Lafferty along with his wife Tracy, and co-crew chief Calvin Wood. Lafferty Motorsports fielded the No. 89 Ford F-150 in the NASCAR Camping World Truck Series for Lafferty and Mike Harmon. The team also runs a driver development service in the ARCA RE/MAX Series and other late model racing series, as well as building its own engines. Lafferty Motorsports has not fielded a truck since the 2011 season. In November 2011, Chris Lafferty was signed by Fox Sports Network to host the show "Chris Lafferty's Motorsports Show" with airing starting in January 2012. In July 2015, team owner and driver Chris Lafferty announced his team's return to competition, beginning in Bristol in August, though this never occurred.

References

External links
 

Companies based in North Carolina
Defunct NASCAR teams